Aberystwyth railway station is a railway station in the town of Aberystwyth, Ceredigion, Wales. It is also the terminus of the narrow-gauge Vale of Rheidol Railway.

History 
The original station was built in 1864 by the Aberystwith and Welsh Coast Railway for the route to Machynlleth. The neighbouring Manchester & Milford railway was to construct a two road platform adjoining this, to create a joint station and provide access south to Carmarthen. The station was greatly extended in 1925 by the Great Western Railway: the original station building on one side of the platforms was replaced by a grand terminus building.

At that time the station had five platforms: Platform 1 at the south-east end of the station and two island platforms. Platforms 1 and 2 were essentially bay platforms, each of the same length (and shorter than the other three). They were the original Manchester & Milford railway platforms, used for the Carmarthen services (though Platform 2 was occasionally used for main-line trains). The Carmarthen line was closed in 1964 following flood damage. The former Platform 3 is on the other side of Platform 2; it is the only platform still in use for mainline rail and has been redesignated as Platform 1 in recent years. The former Platform 4 (closed in 1982, track removed) is now taken up by the "Craft" freecycling shop. At that time the signal box was also closed and demolished. Access to the station and the station facilities is now primarily via the original 1864 building.
The running-around line between these two, for locomotive-hauled trains, still exists. Platform 5 (closed in the 1960s) was an emergency platform on the other side of Platform 4, but little trace remains. The goods yard has become the Rheidol Retail Park.

With the decline of railway usage and of local tourism, the facilities were far too large for their purpose. The railway yard was lifted in the 1980s and the row of shops in front, known as Western Parade, was demolished in the 1990s to allow construction of a new retail park and bus station. The 1925 station building has seen several uses, including as a local museum, but was eventually sold off and converted into a Wetherspoons pub. This conversion maintained the architecture and won awards including a National Railway Heritage Award in 2003. Other parts of the building have become an Indian restaurant, office space and accommodation for a local furniture recycling scheme.

Vale of Rheidol Railway
The platform that was originally used by trains via Lampeter to Carmarthen is now used by the narrow gauge steam-operated Vale of Rheidol Railway. This railway's track runs parallel to and immediately to the south of the main line as far as Llanbadarn Fawr. Opened in 1902, it originally had its own terminus at "Aberystwyth Smithfield" (named after Smithfield Road, now Park Avenue). This closed in 1925 and was replaced by a station a short distance from the main railway station; that station site is now a supermarket car park. In 1968 its track was rerouted into the former standard gauge bay Platforms 1 and 2 of the main station. As their trains unload at ground level, a new ramp and ground-level island platform were built in the space between the two original platforms. There is a runaround loop and access to the former mainline railway shed. This was used as the storage and works area for the Vale of Rheidol Railway.
From 2014, the Vale of Rheidol railway, with the help of an EU-funded grant, converted the old platform 1 of the Carmarthen branch to a reduced height. This now allows customers to board coaches from the level of the running board, as opposed to from ground level. The access is invaluable to passengers who have mobility issues. This does not allow wheelchairs to be wheeled onto coaches, but the company is working on a solution by adapting some existing rolling stock to this purpose.

In 2011, a purpose-built railway works was built on the site of the old GWR coaling stage. This now allows the railway to carry out heavy maintenance and restorations on its stock. It also allows contract work to be undertaken. The works has an apprentice school.

Today

There were proposals, by the Vale of Rheidol railway,  to establish a railway museum at the station, using structures removed from London Bridge station during modernisation. These proposals went ahead and construction began in 2018 and were set to be complete in late 2020.

Facilities

The station has a staffed ticket office, open six days per week. A self-service ticket machine is also provided for use outside these times and for collecting pre-paid tickets. Other amenities include toilets, waiting room and a customer help point. Train running information is also offered via digital information screens, automatic announcements and timetable posters. There is no ATM. Step-free access is available between the entrance, concourse and platform. Many of these improvements came from the Welsh Government with funding from European Regional Development Fund and the UK Government's National Station Improvement Project.

Services 
As of the May 2015 timetable change, (almost) hourly services have commenced between Aberystwyth and Shrewsbury, some of which continue to Birmingham International .

There were proposals for reinstating a direct train to London which stopped running in 1991. The journey would have taken four hours, but the plan was rejected in 2010.

Departures 

The current service pattern (Mondays to Saturdays) is
16 trains per day to 
12 of which continue to 
8 of which continue to 
7 of which continue to 

The current service pattern (Sundays) is
12 trains per day to 
8 of which continue to 
6 of which continue to

Arrivals 

On Mondays-Saturdays, the station sees 16 arriving services (4 start at Machynlleth, 4 at Shrewsbury, 1 at Birmingham New Street, and 7 at Birmingham International).

On Sundays, the station sees 12 arriving services (3 start at Machynlleth, 3 at Shrewsbury, and 6 at Birmingham International).

Motive power depot

A small engine shed was opened close to the station in 1864 and extended in 1867. This was demolished by the Great Western Railway in 1938 to make way for a larger brick built structure, which is still standing. The shed was not allocated a code by British Railways since it was deemed a sub-shed of Machynlleth, and so locomotives bore that depot's code, 89C.

Aberystwyth Motive Power Depot was notable as being the last steam locomotive depot on the British Rail network. Initially closed under the Beeching report, along with the line to Carmarthen, it was adapted for use by the Vale of Rheidol railway when it relocated to the former Carmarthen platforms. The facility replaced a dilapidated set of small sheds at the railway's original base, at the riverside by the football ground. The area is now used as a car park. The shed area creates a small spur in what is otherwise a linear layout. The Vale of Rheidol was steam operated by British Rail until privatisation in 1989.  Accordingly, it was an often requested posting for staff. the line is still steam operated but is owned by a charitable trust.

A new steel framed locomotive works was completed in late 2011. The building includes a machine shop, restoration workshop and locomotive running shed. The existing former Great Western Railway shed is currently used to house the running fleet.

References

Notes

Sources

External links

Heritage railway stations in Ceredigion
Railway stations in Ceredigion
Former Cambrian Railway stations
Railway stations in Great Britain opened in 1864 
Former Great Western Railway stations
Railway stations in Great Britain opened in 1867 
Railway stations in Great Britain opened in 1925 
Railway stations in Great Britain closed in 1939 
Railway stations in Great Britain opened in 1945

Railway stations served by Transport for Wales Rail
Vale of Rheidol Railway stations
Buildings and structures in Aberystwyth
Transport in Aberystwyth
Grade II listed buildings in Ceredigion
Grade II listed railway stations in Wales
DfT Category D stations